Patrick O'Byrne may refer to:
 Patrick O'Byrne (pianist)
 Patrick O'Byrne (politician)

See also
 Paddy O'Byrne, Irish radio broadcaster and actor
 Patrick Byrne (disambiguation)